Castilleja exserta (formerly Orthocarpus purpurascens) is a species of plant in the genus Castilleja which includes the Indian paintbrushes. Its common names include purple owl's clover, escobita, and exserted Indian paintbrush.

This species is native to the Southwestern United States in various habitats of California, Arizona, and New Mexico; and to Northwestern Mexico. It is an introduced species in Hawaii.

Description

Like other related Castilleja plants, this species is a hemiparasite, deriving some of its nutrients directly from the roots of other plants by infiltrating them with haustoria. As a result, its own leaves are small and reduced.

Although this species is variable in appearance and easily hybridizes with other Castilleja species, it generally bears a brightly colored inflorescence of shaggy pink-purple or lavender flowers. The thin, erect bracts are usually tipped with the same color, giving the inflorescence the appearance of a paintbrush.

Varieties
Varieties include:
Castilleja exserta var. exserta — pale purple owlclover.
Castilleja exserta var. latifolia — wideleaf Indian paintbrush; endemic to coastal California.
Castilleja exserta var. venusta — endemic to California: Mojave Desert, southern San Joaquin Valley.

Bay checkerspot butterfly host
This is a crucial host plant for the Bay checkerspot butterfly (Euphydryas editha bayensis), which is a threatened species that is endemic to the San Francisco Bay region in California.

The seeds were harvested by indigenous peoples of California for food.

References

External links

Closeup photos — at Henry Coe State Park, S.F. Bay Area.
Castilleja exserta — U.C. Photo gallery

exserta
Flora of Northwestern Mexico
Flora of Arizona
Flora of Baja California
Flora of California
Flora of New Mexico
Flora of Sonora
Flora of the California desert regions
Flora of the Klamath Mountains
Flora of the Sierra Nevada (United States)
Natural history of the California chaparral and woodlands
Natural history of the California Coast Ranges
Natural history of the Central Valley (California)
Natural history of the Channel Islands of California
Natural history of the Mojave Desert
Natural history of the Peninsular Ranges
Natural history of the San Francisco Bay Area
Natural history of the Transverse Ranges
Butterfly food plants
Plants used in Native American cuisine
Flora without expected TNC conservation status